Hammad Shoaib is a Pakistani television actor. His notable performances are in Soteli Maamta, Ishq Hai, Pardes, Shehnai and Chaudhry and Sons.

Filmography

Television

Telefilm

References

External links
 
 

1997 births
Living people
21st-century Pakistani male actors
Pakistani male television actors